Paul Stewart Lawrie  (born 1 January 1969) is a Scottish professional golfer who is best known for winning The Open Championship in 1999. He was a vice-captain for the European Ryder Cup team in 2016.

Early career
Lawrie was born in Aberdeen and turned professional in 1986. in 1990 he won the Scottish Assistants' Championship at Cruden Bay by five strokes and the Scottish Under-25 Championship at Deer Park by seven strokes. In 1991 he won the Daily Express Scottish National Pro-am at Carnoustie by a stroke from Craig Maltman. He became a member of the European Tour in 1992. He performed steadily without doing much to draw attention to himself, aside from a 6th-place finish in the 1993 Open Championship. In his first seven seasons his only top 50 finish on the Order of Merit came in 1996 when he was 21st. However he also finished in the top 100 in all but one of the other six seasons, and picked up a debut tour win at the 1996 Catalan Open.

1999 onwards
Lawrie's career was transformed in 1999. After winning the Qatar Masters (a European Tour event) early in the season, he went on to win the 1999 Open Championship at Carnoustie in July. This was the Open where the Frenchman Jean van de Velde blew a three-shot lead on the final hole. Lawrie won a four-hole playoff against Van de Velde and American Justin Leonard. An unusual aspect of Lawrie's victory was that he was neither leader nor co-leader at any time during his regulation 72 holes, only moving into a share of the lead when the leaders came back to him after he had completed his final round. Also, Lawrie came back from the largest third-round deficit ever faced by a major championship winner - going into the final day, he trailed the leader, Van de Velde, by 10 shots. This is also the record for the biggest final-round comeback on the PGA Tour.

After his major championship victory, Lawrie's game shifted to a higher level without quite moving him into the global elite group of golfers. He finished 9th on the European Tour Order of Merit in 1999; 6th in 2001, when he captured the lucrative Dunhill Links Championship; and 10th in 2002, when he won his fifth European Tour title at the Celtic Manor Resort Wales Open.

In March 2001, the Paul Lawrie Foundation was created. The Foundation aims to support and sustain an interest and enthusiasm for the game of golf amongst under 18s. Activities are delivered in a fun and relaxed setting with equipment provided if necessary. The Foundation has grown rapidly and now includes football and hockey. In 2011, a 54-hole tournament, the Paul Lawrie Invitational was added to the Tartan Tour.

After winning the Open, Lawrie was a member of the PGA Tour for several seasons, while also continuing to compete on the European Tour. He enjoyed little success in the U.S. and when his five-year major championship exemption expired at the end of the 2004 season, he lost his PGA Tour card.

Lawrie was the last European player to win a major until 2007, when that drought was ended by Pádraig Harrington of Ireland in The Open Championship. He was the last player from the United Kingdom to win a major until Graeme McDowell won the 2010 U.S. Open. Lawrie is still the last player from Scotland to win a major.

At the 2009 Open Championship at Turnberry, Lawrie scored what is believed to be only the eighth albatross (double eagle) in the competition's 150-year history by holing his second shot at the par 5 seventh hole in the final round.

On 27 March 2011, Lawrie won the Open de Andalucía de Golf by one stroke over Johan Edfors. Lawrie finished the championship at −12 and in doing so ended a nine-year period without a tour win.

In February 2012, Lawrie won the Commercialbank Qatar Masters for the second time in his career, having previously won in 1999. Lawrie became only the second player to have won the tournament more than once alongside Adam Scott. It was Lawrie's seventh win on the European Tour. The tournament was reduced to 54 holes after strong winds hampered the play during rounds one and two. He won by four strokes over Jason Day and Peter Hanson after a final round of 65.

Lawrie skipped the 2012 U.S. Open in an attempt to qualify for the 2012 Ryder Cup. He secured qualification with victory at the Johnnie Walker Championship at Gleneagles in August. He has stated that he would accept the captain's role for the 2014 Ryder Cup if offered. Lawrie helped Team Europe retain the Ryder Cup at Medinah. He finished the season in the top 10 of the Order of Merit for the first time in ten years.

Lawrie was appointed Member of the Order of the British Empire (MBE) in 2000 and Officer of the Order of the British Empire (OBE) in the 2013 Birthday Honours for voluntary service to golf.

On 1 October 2020, Lawrie announced that he would be retiring from the European Tour following his 620th career event at the Aberdeen Standard Investments Scottish Open due to back problems and would instead compete on the European Senior Tour moving forward.

Non-playing work
Lawrie is passionate about junior golf and his Paul Lawrie Foundation has taught thousands of youngsters. In 2012 he bought Aspire Golf Centre in Aberdeen (now called the Paul Lawrie Golf Centre). Partly due to this, he was named by the Golf Club Managers' Association's Golf Club Management magazine as the 37th most powerful person in British golf. Lawrie is a fan of Aberdeen FC.

Lawrie was a columnist for bunkered golf magazine between 1999 and 2004.

Lawrie has his own golf brand, called Cardinal Golf.

Family
Lawrie's son Craig is also a professional golfer.

Professional wins (19)

PGA Tour wins (1)

PGA Tour playoff record (1–0)

European Tour wins (8)

*Note: Tournament shortened to 36/54 holes due to weather.

European Tour playoff record (1–2)

Sunshine Tour wins (1)

Sunshine Tour playoff record (0–1)

Other wins (7)
1990 Scottish Assistants' Championship, Scottish Under-25 Championship
1991 Daily Express Scottish National Pro-am
1992 UAP European Under-25 Championship, Scottish PGA Championship
2002 Aberdeen Asset Management Scottish Match Play Championship
2005 Scottish PGA Championship

European Senior Tour wins (3)

European Senior Tour playoff record (1–1)

Major championships

Wins (1)

1Defeated Leonard and van de Velde in 4-hole playoff: Lawrie (5-4-3-3=15), Leonard (5-4-4-5=18), van de Velde (6-4-3-5=18).

Results timeline
Results not in chronological order in 2020.

 

CUT = missed the half-way cut
"T" indicates a tie for a place
NT = No tournament due to the COVID-19 pandemic

Summary

Most consecutive cuts made – 7 (2011 Open Championship – 2013 Open Championship)
Longest streak of top-10s – 1 (twice)

Results in The Players Championship

CUT = missed the halfway cut
"T" indicates a tie for a place

Results in World Golf Championships
Results not in chronological order before 2015.

1Cancelled due to 9/11

QF, R16, R32, R64 = Round in which player lost in match play
"T" = Tied
Note that the HSBC Champions did not become a WGC event until 2009.

Team appearances
World Cup (representing Scotland): 1996, 2000, 2002, 2003
Alfred Dunhill Cup (representing Scotland): 1999
Ryder Cup (representing Europe): 1999, 2012 (winners)
Seve Trophy (representing Great Britain & Ireland): 2000, 2002 (winners), 2003 (winners), 2013
Royal Trophy (representing Europe): 2009, 2013 (winners)

See also
List of golfers with most European Tour wins

References

External links

Scottish male golfers
European Tour golfers
PGA Tour golfers
Winners of men's major golf championships
Ryder Cup competitors for Europe
People educated at Kemnay Academy
Officers of the Order of the British Empire
Sportspeople from Aberdeen
1969 births
Living people